is a Japanese idol, singer, and actress. She has released a number of DVDs. She is best known for her role as Remi Freedle in Chousei Kantai Sazer-X.

Matsuyama cosplayed as Mao Ran, a character in a video game titled Fighting Beauty Wulong.

In 2006, she portrayed Shiori in Gal Circle. In 2007, Matsuyama released her debut single entitled "Matataku Mami: Mitsumete Hoshii". She also starred in the television drama Body Conscious Cop in that year.

Filmography

Films
 Chousei Kantai Sazer-X the Movie: Fight! Star Warriors (2005), Remi Freedle
 Kurosagi (2008)

Television
 Chousei Kantai Sazer-X (2005–2006), Remi Freedle
 Gal Circle (2006), Shiori
 Body Conscious Cop (2007)

Discography

Singles
 "Matataku Mami: Mitsumete Hoshii" (2007)

References

External links
 

Japanese gravure idols
Japanese television personalities
Living people
1988 births